The 2010 New Orleans mayoral election was held on February 6, 2010, to elect the Mayor of New Orleans, Louisiana. Incumbent Democratic Mayor Ray Nagin was term-limited and ineligible to run for re-election to a third term.

Democrat Mitch Landrieu, the Lieutenant Governor of Louisiana, was elected mayor in a landslide and was sworn in on May 3, 2010.

Candidates
Several candidates in multiple parties registered to run for the office of Mayor of New Orleans.

Democratic
 John Georges, businessman and 2007 gubernatorial candidate
 Troy Henry
 Mitch Landrieu, Lieutenant Governor of Louisiana
 James Perry, fair housing advocate
 Nadine Ramsey, retired judge (resigned to run for mayor)

Republican
 Rob Couhig, lawyer, businessman, entrepreneur and candidate for mayor in 2006
 Thomas A. Lambert, quality control specialist

Independent
 Jonah Bascle, comedian and disability activist
 Manny "Chevrolet" Bruno, textbook salesman and candidate for mayor in 2002 and 2006
 Jerry Jacobs, retired immigration agent, cannabis decriminalization activist and Independent candidate for Louisiana's 2nd congressional district in 2008
 Norbert P. Rome, community activist and candidate for mayor in 2006

Not qualifying
 Brad Pitt, actor. Despite a tongue-in-cheek "Brad Pitt for Mayor" campaign by some locals, Pitt was not actually running. He does not qualify under the city charter, which specifies candidates must have been New Orleans residents for at least 5 years.

Results
The 2010 New Orleans mayoral election occurred on the day before Super Bowl XLIV, the first (and only) Super Bowl for which the New Orleans Saints have ever competed. The year's highly successful football season brought about an unprecedented amount of local support for the team and resulted in relatively low voter turnouts due to preoccupation with citywide celebrations.

References 

2010 Louisiana elections
2010
New Orleans